Destroy All Monsters is the second live album from the band Raven. It was recorded at "Club Cittá" in Tokyo, Japan, in 1995 and released a year later. Raven plays more songs from the early 1980s rather that those from late 1980s (the most commercial era).

Track listing
 "Victim" - 4:12
 "Live at the Inferno" - 4:45
 "Crash! Bang! Wallop" - 2:46
 "True Believer" - 4:40
 "Medley: Into the Jaws of Death / Hard as Nails / Die for Allah" - 9:35
 "Guitar solo" - 2:16
 "Medley: Speed of the Reflex / Run Silent, Run Deep / Mind over Metal" - 6:30
 "Gimme a Reason" - 4:46
 "Inquisitor" - 4:20
 "For the Future" - 4:01
 "Bass solo" - 1:24
 "Architect of Fear" - 4:56
 "White Hot Anger" - 4:45
 "Drum solo" - 1:34
 "Break the Chain" - 13:20

Personnel
John Gallagher - bass, vocals
Mark Gallagher - guitar
Joe Hasselvander - drums

References

Raven (British band) albums
1996 live albums
SPV/Steamhammer live albums